Pentti Korhonen (born 14 June 1951) is a Finnish former professional motorcycle road racer. He competed in Grand Prix motorcycle racing between 1969 to 1979.

Korhonen was born in Rantasalmi, Finland. He had his most successful year in 1975 when he won the 350cc Yugoslavian Grand Prix and finished in third place in the 350cc World Championship, behind Johnny Cecotto and Giacomo Agostini.

References

External links
Pentti Korhonen home page

1951 births
Living people
People from Rantasalmi
Finnish motorcycle racers
250cc World Championship riders
350cc World Championship riders
500cc World Championship riders
Isle of Man TT riders
Sportspeople from South Savo